Wakiso Giants FC is a football team from Wakiso, Uganda currently playing in the Uganda Premier League.

History
The club was established in 2009 as Artland Katale by flamboyant City Lawyer, Muhammad Bazirengedde. During that campaign in the first division as well as the second division, the club hosted their games at Katale, moved to Taibah, and later Mashariki. But the club shifted their home ground to Buziga Islamic pitch, along Ggaba Road after qualifying for the Fufa Big League.

However, after three seasons of very little success, the club owner then opted to sell it off.

Post Artland Katale Era

From Artland, the team was bought off by then, Kamuli Park, then a Regional side in Eastern Uganda. Under Abedi Muwanika, the chairman of the club then, it rose to the second highest division in Ugandan football, the Fufa Big League.

In its first season as a merger, it was referred to as Artland Kamuli Park as per the regulations of the Ugandan FA in 2016/17 but gained full independence in the following season changing name to Kamuli Park. The 2017/18 season proved better as the team put up spirited performances but missed out on promotion to the Azam Uganda Premier League – finishing fourth in Rwenzori Group, a slot behind Promotional Play Offs.

New Era

In June 2018, a group of Business men bought the club and re-named it Wakiso Giants Football Club. The renaming of the club was crystal clear since it shifted home from Kamuli (Eastern Uganda) to Wakiso (Central Uganda) and the owners hail from the area. It immediately went on a signing spree acquiring some of the best talent on the land and also embarked on rebranding.

Ground
Giants play their home matches at Kabaka Kyabaggu stadium, also known as Wakissha Resource Centre in Wakiso. However, due to stadium-quality and a disagreement with the Ugandan football licensing authorities, the Purple Sharks played their home games for the 2018–19 season in the Fufa Big League at Kyabazinga Stadium, Bugembe.

References

External links
Soccerway

Football clubs in Uganda